The Mark 27 nuclear bomb and closely related W27 warhead were two American thermonuclear bomb designs from the late 1950s.

History and design

The Mark 27 was designed by the University of California Radiation Laboratory (UCRL; now Lawrence Livermore National Laboratory) starting in the mid-1950s. The basic design concept competed with the Los Alamos Scientific Laboratory (LASL; now Los Alamos National Laboratory) design that would become the Mark 28 / B-28 nuclear bomb and W28 warhead. The Mark 27 was roughly twice as heavy as the Mark 28/B-28/W28 family of thermonuclear weapons.

The Mark 27 and W27 were produced from 1958; both were retired by 1964, as the Kennedy administration began to redirect funding from manned nuclear bomber programs.  Both US Navy bombers carrying the Mark 27 bomb, the Douglas A-3 Skywarrior and North American A-5 Vigilante, were repurposed from the nuclear strike role to tanker, electronic countermeasure (A-3) or reconnaissance (A-5) roles by 1965.

The W-27 warhead was withdrawn from service along with the Regulus cruise missile in 1964.

Explanatory notes

See also
 List of nuclear weapons
 SSM-N-9 Regulus II

References

External links
 Allbombs.html list of all US nuclear warheads at nuclearweaponarchive.org

Cold War aerial bombs of the United States
Nuclear bombs of the United States
Military equipment introduced in the 1950s